James Pike (November 10, 1818 – July 26, 1895) was a U.S. Representative from New Hampshire and served with the Union Army during the American Civil War.

Biography
Born in Salisbury, Massachusetts, Pike pursued classical studies, then studied theology at Wesleyan University in Connecticut from 1837 to 1839. He served as a minister from 1841 to 1854. He moved to Pembroke, New Hampshire, in 1854. Pike was elected as an American Party candidate to the Thirty-fourth Congress and reelected as a Republican to the Thirty-fifth Congress (March 4, 1855 - March 3, 1859). He was not a candidate for renomination in 1858. During the Civil War, Pike served as colonel of the 16th New Hampshire Volunteer Infantry, from November 1, 1862, to August 20, 1863. He fought in the Siege of Port Hudson in 1863. He was an unsuccessful candidate for governor of New Hampshire in 1871. He resumed preaching and became presiding elder of the Dover district. He discontinued active duties in 1886 and lived in retirement until his death in Newfields, New Hampshire, July 26, 1895.
He was interred in Locust Cemetery.

References

External links 
 

1818 births
1895 deaths
People from Salisbury, Massachusetts
New Hampshire Know Nothings
Wesleyan University alumni
Union Army colonels
Know-Nothing members of the United States House of Representatives from New Hampshire
Republican Party members of the United States House of Representatives from New Hampshire
19th-century American politicians
People from Newfields, New Hampshire
Military personnel from Massachusetts